The 1700 Cascadia earthquake occurred along the Cascadia subduction zone on January 26, 1700, with an estimated moment magnitude of 8.7–9.2. The megathrust earthquake involved the Juan de Fuca Plate from mid-Vancouver Island, south along the Pacific Northwest coast as far as northern California.

The earthquake caused a tsunami which struck the west coast of North America and the coast of Japan. Japanese tsunami records, along with reconstructions of the wave moving across the ocean, put the earthquake at about 9pm on the evening of 26 January 1700.

Evidence 
The earthquake took place at about 21:00 Pacific Time on January 26, 1700 (NS). Although there are no written records for the region from the time, the timing of the earthquake has been inferred from Japanese records of a tsunami that does not correlate with any other Pacific Rim quake. The Japanese records exist primarily in the modern-day Iwate Prefecture, in communities such as Tsugaruishi, Miyako (Kuwagasaki) and Ōtsuchi.

Scientific research
The most important clue linking the tsunami in Japan and the earthquake in the Pacific Northwest comes from studies of tree rings (dendrochronology), which show that several "ghost forests" of red cedar trees in Oregon and Washington, killed by lowering of coastal forests into the tidal zone by the earthquake, have outermost growth rings that formed in 1699, the last growing season before the tsunami. This includes both inland stands of trees, such as one on the Copalis River in Washington, and pockets of tree stumps that are now under the ocean surface and become exposed only at low tide.

Sediment layers in these locations demonstrate a pattern consistent with seismic and tsunami events around this time. Core samples from the ocean floor, as well as debris samples from some earthquake-induced landslides in the Pacific Northwest, also support this timing of the event. Archaeological research in the region has uncovered evidence of several coastal villages having been flooded and abandoned around 1700.

Cultural research 
The contemporary indigenous groups of Cascadia had no known written documentation like that of the Japanese tsunami, but numerous oral traditions describing a great earthquake and inundation exist among indigenous coastal peoples from British Columbia to Northern California. These do not specify a date, and not all earthquake stories in the region can be ascribed to the 1700 quake; however, virtually all of the native peoples in the region have at least one traditional story of an event of unmatched destructive power.

Some of the stories contain temporal clues — such as a time estimate in generations since the event — which suggest a date range in the late 1600s or early 1700s, or which concur with the event's timing in other ways. For instance, the Huu-ay-aht legend of a large earthquake and ocean wave devastating their settlements at Pachena Bay places the event on a winter evening shortly after the village's residents had gone to sleep (consistent with the 9pm reconstructed time). The only other survivor was Anacla aq sop, a young woman who happened to be staying that day at Kiix-in on the more tsunami-sheltered Barkley Sound.

Kwakwaka'wakw (Kwakiutl) stories from the north end of Vancouver Island report a night-time earthquake that caused virtually all houses in their community to collapse; Cowichan stories from Vancouver Island's inner coast speak of a nighttime earthquake, causing a landslide that buried an entire village. Makah stories from Washington speak of a great night-time earthquake, of which the only survivors were those who fled inland before the tsunami hit. The Quileute people in Washington have a story about a flood so powerful that villagers in their canoes were swept inland all the way to Hood Canal.

Ethnographic research has focused on a common regional pattern of art and mythology depicting a great battle between a thunderbird and a whale, as well as cultural signifiers such as earthquake-inspired ritual masks and dances.

Future threats 

The geological record reveals that "great earthquakes" (those with moment magnitude 8 or higher) occur in the Cascadia subduction zone about every 500 years on average, often accompanied by tsunamis. There is evidence of at least 13 events at intervals from about 300 to 900 years with an average of 570–590 years. Previous earthquakes are estimated to have been in AD 1310, AD 810, AD 400, 170 BC and 600 BC.

As seen in the 1700 quake, the 2004 Indian Ocean earthquake, and the 2011 Tōhoku earthquake and tsunami, subduction zone earthquakes can cause large tsunamis, and many coastal areas in the region have prepared tsunami evacuation plans in anticipation of a possible future Cascadia earthquake.  However, the major nearby cities, notably Seattle, Portland, Vancouver, Victoria, and Tacoma, which are located on inland waterways rather than on the coast, would be sheltered from the full brunt of a tsunami.  These cities do have many vulnerable structures, especially bridges and unreinforced brick buildings; consequently, most of the damage to the cities would probably be from the earthquake itself. One expert asserts that buildings in Seattle are vastly inadequate even to withstand an event of the size of the 1906 San Francisco earthquake, let alone any more powerful one.

Kenneth Murphy, who directs FEMA's Region X, the division responsible for Oregon, Washington, Idaho, and Alaska, put it quite dramatically: "Our operating assumption is that everything west of Interstate 5 will be toast."

Recent findings conclude that the Cascadia subduction zone is more complex and volatile than previously believed. In 2010, geologists predicted a 37% chance of an M8.2+ event within 50 years, and a 10 to 15% chance that the entire Cascadia subduction zone will rupture with an M9+ event within the same time frame. Geologists have also determined the Pacific Northwest is not prepared for such a colossal quake.

A 2004 study revealed the potential for relative mean sea level rise (caused by subsidence) along the Cascadia subduction zone. It postulated that cities on the west coast of Vancouver Island, such as Tofino and Ucluelet, are at risk for a 1–2 m subsidence, relative to mean sea level.

The confirmation of their oral traditions about a great earthquake has led many aboriginal groups in the area to initiate projects to relocate their coastal communities to higher and safer ground in preparation for the predicted next earthquake. The Huu-ay-aht People have rebuilt their administration building on a high point of land in their territory; coastal residents are immediately evacuated to this building whenever a tsunami warning is issued, as an interim measure toward eventually relocating all residents to higher ground. The Quileute people secured a land grant from the federal government of the United States in 2012 to move their settlement inland, both as protection from a future tsunami threat and because of more frequent flooding on the Quillayute River. The Shoalwater Bay Indian Tribe has also sought federal funding to move their community uphill and has received a FEMA PDM grant to build the first vertical evacuation tower on their coast, completed near the Tokeland Marina in 2022.

Some other subduction zones have such earthquakes every 100 to 200 years; the longer interval results from slower plate motions.

Bridge of the Gods – Bonneville Slide 
It was once conjectured that the Cascadia earthquake may also have been linked to the Bridge of the Gods – Bonneville Slide and the Tseax Cone eruption in British Columbia, Canada. However, recent investigations using radiocarbon dating and dendrochronology date the Bonneville landslide around 1450.

See also 

1585 Aleutian Islands earthquake
1949 Queen Charlotte Islands earthquake
Geology of the Pacific Northwest
List of earthquakes in Canada
List of earthquakes in the United States
List of historical earthquakes
List of tsunamis
Lists of earthquakes
Neskowin Ghost Forest

References

External links

General 
Cascadia Subduction Zone Earthquakes: A magnitude 9.0 earthquake scenario – The Cascadia Region Earthquake Workgroup 2005
Tsunami Animation: Cascadia 1700 – Pacific Tsunami Warning Center
USGS Scientist Shows Evidence for 300-Year-Old Tsunami to Participants in International Tsunami Training Institute – USGS

Native and Japanese accounts 
Native American Stories expand history – Pacific Northwest Seismic Network
Native American Legends of Tsunamis in Pacific NW – United States Geological Survey
Fault slip and seismic moment of the 1700 Cascadia earthquake inferred from Japanese tsunami descriptions – Journal of Geophysical Research
Japanese Shipwreck Adds To Evidence Of Great Cascadia Earthquake In 1700 – ScienceDaily

Current hazards 
Surviving a Tsunami—Lessons from Chile, Hawaii, and Japan – United States Geological Survey
Big earthquake coming sooner than we thought, Oregon geologist says – The Oregonian

1700 Cascadia
1700 in Canada
1700 tsunamis
17th century in California
1700 Cascadia
1700 Cascadia
1700 Cascadia
1700 Cascadia
1700 Cascadia
1700 Cascadia
Tsunamis in the United States
1700 Cascadia